Florida's 9th congressional district is a congressional district in the U.S. state of Florida. It stretches from eastern Orlando south-southeast to Yeehaw Junction. It also includes the cities of Kissimmee and St. Cloud.

From 2003 to 2012, it encompassed most of rural eastern Hillsborough County, northern parts of Pinellas County (including Clearwater) and the Gulf coast of Pasco County (including New Port Richey). The redistricting on January 3, 2013, completely reassigned the boundaries of the 9th district to mostly Osceola County with central Orange County plus northeastern Polk County, while the former 9th district became parts of the 10th, 11th, 12th (Pasco County) or the 14th district which split Hillsborough County with the 15th and 17th district. The 2013 redistricting also expanded the State of Florida from 25 to 27 districts, adding 2 at Miami-Dade County, Florida.

The district is currently represented by Democrat Darren Soto.

Statewide election results

Presidential election results
Results from previous presidential elections

Non-presidential results
Results from previous non-presidential statewide elections

List of U.S. representatives

Election results

2002

2004

2006

2008

2010

2012

2014

2016

2018

2020

2022

Historical district boundaries

References

Congressional Biographical Directory of the United States 1774–present

09